Barrio Balboa is one of the 18 corregimientos of La Chorrera District. The population is of 33,214 peoples, and its representative is Pedro A. Montero H..

References 

Populated places in Panamá Province